Luis Alberto Zepeda Félix (born 1 September 1965) is a Mexican Paralympic athlete who competes in category F54 throwing events.

At the 2004 Summer Paralympics Luis competed in the shot put, discus throw and javelin throw, winning a gold medal in the javelin. He then won gold in Beijing, bronze in London and silver at the Rio Paralympic Games in the same event.

References

1965 births
Living people
Paralympic athletes of Mexico
Athletes (track and field) at the 2004 Summer Paralympics
Athletes (track and field) at the 2008 Summer Paralympics
Athletes (track and field) at the 2012 Summer Paralympics
Athletes (track and field) at the 2016 Summer Paralympics
Paralympic gold medalists for Mexico
Paralympic silver medalists for Mexico
Paralympic bronze medalists for Mexico
Mexican male discus throwers
Mexican male javelin throwers
Mexican male shot putters
Medalists at the 2004 Summer Paralympics
Medalists at the 2008 Summer Paralympics
Medalists at the 2012 Summer Paralympics
Medalists at the 2016 Summer Paralympics
Paralympic medalists in athletics (track and field)
Medalists at the 2007 Parapan American Games
Medalists at the 2011 Parapan American Games
Medalists at the 2015 Parapan American Games